Buen Día (Spanish: Good Morning) is an Uruguayan morning television show that is broadcast on Channel 4 since March 23, 2020. Presented by Jaime Clara since 2022, it is the successor of Buen Día Uruguay aired from 1998 to 2020.

History 
"Buen Día" debuted on Monday, March 23, 2020, exactly three days after the ending of its predecessor. Currently it is broadcast from Monday to Friday at 8 a.m, having 120 minutes on the air per program, with commercial breaks.

On-air staff 

 Jaime Clara (Host; 2022–present).

 Daniel Nogueira (Panelist; 2020–present).
 Jimena Sabaris (Panelist; 2020–present).
 Martín Fablet (Panelist; 2020–present).
 Diana Piñeyro (Panelist; 2022–present).

Former on-air staff 

 Magdalena Prado (Panelist; 2020–2021).
 Claudia García (Anchor; 2020–2021).
 Daro Kneubuhler (Panelist; 2020–2022).

References

External links 

 

Uruguayan television shows
2010s Uruguayan television series debuts
Uruguayan television news programmes
Canal 4 (Uruguayan TV channel) original programming